Fort Sherman (1878–1900) was a military post in the northwest United States, located in northern Idaho at Coeur d'Alene. General William T. Sherman (1820–91) of the U.S. Army had recommended the site  after an inspection tour in 1877.

On the north shore of Lake Coeur d'Alene and the east bank of the outflowing Spokane River, it began as a camp the next year, became Fort Coeur d'Alene in 1879, and the adjacent city grew. Sherman later visited the fort; it was named for him in 1887, three years after his retirement.

The fort became unoccupied during the Spanish–American War (1898) and was abandoned shortly after. The site is now the campus of North Idaho College.

A succeeding Fort Sherman was located in the Panama Canal Zone, operated by the U.S. Army from 1911 to 1999.

See also
Fort Colville
Fort Spokane

References

External links

Museum of North Idaho – Fort Sherman Chapel

National Register of Historic Places in Kootenai County, Idaho
Sherman